This article refers to the original incarnations of the New York State League, which operated between 1885 and 1917.  For the modern league, see New York State League
The New York State League was a minor league baseball league that played between 1885 and 1917. The league began play as an Independent level league before playing from 1902 to 1917 as a Class B level league. League franchises were based in New York and Pennsylvania. John H. Farrell served as president of the league from 1897 to 1917.

History
The first New York State League in 1885, was actually the second of the many names the International League used before settling on its longterm moniker.

The second New York State League was a six team league for one season in 1889. Oneida was expelled from the league on July 12, and Seneca Falls disbanded August 19.

The third and longest running New York State League was a solid league that lasted from 1899 through 1917. The league was classified as a Class B league in 1902 when the National Association of Professional Baseball Leagues was formed.  The loop, which also had teams in Pennsylvania, was also remarkably stable in terms of membership for any minor league of that era. Binghamton and Utica lasted the whole 19-year run.

Baseball Hall of Fame members Grover Cleveland Alexander (1910 Syracuse Stars), Johnny Evers (1902 Troy Trojans) and Bucky Harris (1917 Reading Pretzels) played in the league.

Cities represented

Albany, NY: Albany Senators 1885, 1890, 1894–1895, 1899–1916
Amsterdam, NY: Amsterdam Carpet Tacks 1894; Amsterdam Red Stockings 1895
Amsterdam, NY / Johnstown, NY / Gloversville, NY: Amsterdam-Gloversville-Johnstown Jags 1902; Amsterdam–Gloversville–Johnstown Hypens 1903–1904; Amsterdam-Gloversville-Johnstown Jags 1905–1908
Auburn, NY: Auburn 1889; Auburn Maroons 1897–1898; Auburn Pioneers 1899
Binghamton, NY: Binghamton Bingoes 1885; Binghamton Crickets 1895; Binghamton Bingoes 1899–1917
Canandaigua, NY: Canandaigua 1889;
Cobleskill, NY: Cobleskill Giants 1890;
Cortland, NY: Cortland Wagonmakers 1899–1901
Elmira, NY: Elmira Colonels 1885; Elmira 1889; Elmira Pioneers 1895, 1900; Elmira Rams 1908, Elmira Pioneers 1908–1917
Gloversville, NY: Gloversville Glovers 1895
Harrisburg, PA: Harrisburg Islanders 1916–1917
Ilion, NY:  Ilion Typewriters 1901–1904
Johnstown, NY: Johnstown Buckskins 1894–1895
Johnstown, NY & Gloversville, NY: Johnstown-Gloversville 1890;
Kingston, NY: Kingston Patriarchs 1894
Oneida, NY: Oneida 1889;
Oneonta, NY: Oneonta 1890;
Oswego, NY: Oswego Sweegs 1885; Oswego Oswegos 1899; Oswego Grays 1900
Palmyra, NY: Palmyra Mormans 1897–1898
Pittsfield, MA: Pittsfield Colts 1894
Poughkeepsie, NY: Poughkeepsie Bridge Citys 1894
Reading, PA: Reading Pretzels 1916–1917
Rochester, NY: Rochester Flour Cities 1885;
Rome, NY: Rome Romans 1899–1901
Schenectady, NY: Schenectady Dorpians 1895; Schenectady Electricians 1899–1902; Schenectady Frog Alleys 1903; Schenectady Electricians 1904
Scranton, PA: Scranton Miners 1904–1917
Seneca Falls, NY:  Seneca Falls Maroons 1889;
Syracuse, NY: Syracuse Stars 1885; 1902–1917
Troy, NY: Troy (NY) Trojans 1890, 1895; Troy Washerwomen 1899–1900; Troy (NY) Trojans 1901–1916
Utica, NY: Utica Pentups 1885; Utica 1889; Utica Pent-Ups 1890; 1899–1909; Utica Utes 1910–1917
Waverly, NY: Waverly Wagonmakers 1901
Wilkes-Barre, PA: Wilkes-Barre Barons 1905–1917

Standings and statistics

1885 to 1904
1885 New York State League

Elmira entered the league July 10 and disbanded July 26; Albany disbanded July 27. 

1889 New York State League

Oneida was expelled July 12; Seneca Falls disbanded August 19. 
 
1890 New York State League
Oneonta disbanded September 3; Cobleskill disbanded September 20 
 
1894 New York State League
Albany and Pittsfield disbanded July 3 
 
1895 New York State League
Albany and Troy disbanded May 20;   Gloversville and Johnstown disbanded July 4 

1897 New York State League
Cortland joined the league June 2; Batavia (11–33) transferred to Geneva July 25 
 
1898 New York State League
Palmyra (25–35) disbanded July 22, franchise to Johnstown (4–4) Aug 6, Johnstown disbanded August 16; Lyons disbanded August 12 
 
1899 New York State League
Auburn (27–43) moved to Troy August 1. 
 
1900 New York State League
 Oswego (20–45) moved to Elmira July 30. 
 
1901 New York State League
Cortland (22–34) moved to Waverly July 11. 
 
1902 New York State League
 
 
1903 New York State League
 
 
1904 New York State League
Schenectady (20–39) moved to Scranton July 17.

1905 to 1910
1905 New York State League
 

1906 New York State League
 

1907 New York State League
 
 
1908 New York State League
Amsterdam–Gloversville–Johnstown (1–8) reorganized and became 'Johnstown-Gloversville' (11–54) May 18, then moved to Elmira (24–42) July 22. 
 
1909 New York State League
 
 
1910 New York State League

1911 to 1917
1911 New York State League
 
 
1912 New York State League
 
 
1913 New York State League
 
 
1914 New York State League
 
 
1915 New York State League
 
 
1916 New York State League
Troy (8–27) moved to Harrisburg June 20; Albany (51–57) moved to Reading August 21.
 
1917 New York State League
 Harrisburg and Utica disbanded July 4.

Hall of Fame alumni
Grover Cleveland Alexander, 1910 Syracuse Stars
Johnny Evers, 1902 Troy (NY) Trojans
Bucky Harris, 1917 Reading Pretzels

References

Baseball leagues in New York (state)
Defunct baseball leagues in the United States
Sports leagues established in 1885
Defunct minor baseball leagues in the United States
Baseball leagues in Pennsylvania
1885 establishments in New York (state)
Sports leagues disestablished in 1917
1917 disestablishments in the United States
Baseball leagues in Massachusetts